Fish Creek State Park is a public recreation area covering  twelve miles west of Alberton, Montana. The state park is the second largest in Montana after Makoshika State Park and is home to Montana's largest ponderosa pine.

History
The state acquired the park site from The Nature Conservancy in 2010. The property had been part of the 310,000 acres The Nature Conservancy and The Trust for Public Land purchased in 2008 from Plum Creek Timber as part of the Montana Legacy Project through which the company divested a large portion of its holdings for purposes of conservation and use by the public.

Activities and amenities
The park offers hiking, picnicking, fishing, and mountain biking.

References

External links
Fish Creek State Park Montana Fish, Wildlife & Parks

State parks of Montana
Protected areas of Mineral County, Montana
Protected areas established in 2010
2010 establishments in Montana